Terekeyevo (Tiräkäy) is a rural locality (a village) in Mavlyutovsky Selsoviet, Mishkinsky District, Bashkortostan, Russia. The population was 130 as of 2010. There are 5 streets.

Geography 
Terekeyevo is located 25 km north of Mishkino (the district's administrative centre) by road. Staroatnagulovo is the nearest rural locality.

References 

Rural localities in Mishkinsky District